Browns Corner or Brown's Corners may refer to:
 Browns Corner, Indiana
 Browns Corner, Virginia (disambiguation), multiple locations
 Browns Corner, West Virginia
 Brown's Corners, Ontario (disambiguation), several places in Canada